Codexis, Inc. is a protein engineering company that develops enzymes for pharmaceutical, food and medical applications.

History 
Codexis is based in Redwood City, CA and was incorporated in 2002. It went public in April 2010 on NASDAQ, and in October, acquired Maxygen's MolecularBreeding technology portfolio.

Pharmaceutical 
Codexis won the Presidential Green Chemistry Challenge Award from the U.S. Environmental Protection Agency (EPA) in 2006 for its work on a building block of Lipitor. It then won a second time in 2010 for its work with Merck & Co. on the active ingredient in Januvia.

Nutrition 
In 2017, the company entered a partnership with Tate & Lyle to provide research and development for the production of new ingredients. That same year, Codexis announced a collaboration with Nestle to provide enzymes for metabolic disorders.

Biotherapeutics 
In 2017, Codexis developed a recombinant phenylalanine ammonia-lyase (PAL) enzyme, to act as a substitute phenylalanine hydroxylase (PAH) enzyme for people who suffer from phenylketonuria. The enzyme was in-licensed by Nestle Health Sciences.

In 2020, Takeda Pharmaceutical announced a collaboration with Codexis to research and create gene therapies for rare diseases, including lysosomal storage disorders.

Life science 
In June 2020, they announced a partnership with Molecular Assemblies to engineer enzymes for DNA synthesis.

Technology 
Codexis uses directed evolution to develop its enzymes. Using this method, scientists genetically engineer genes, then screen the enzymes produced to see if it creates the properties needed for a specific reaction. Their protein engineering platform, called CodeEvolver, uses machine learning and high-thoroughput experimentation to learn protein sequence changes and their impacts on protein function.

References

External links

Biotechnology companies of the United States
Companies listed on the Nasdaq
2002 establishments in California
Biotechnology companies established in 2002
Companies based in Redwood City, California